Dr. Ngairangbam Bijoy Singh (born 1 March 1946 in Imphal) is a medical doctor and politician from Manipur, India. He studied medicine in Guwahati and urology in Manchester, UK. He was appointed director of the Regional Institute of Medical Sciences in June 1996. In 2003, he became Vice-Chancellor of Manipur University. In 2007 he was elected to the Legislative Assembly of Manipur, as the Manipur People's Party candidate in the Khurai constituency.

References

Living people
1946 births
Manipur politicians
Manipur Peoples Party politicians
Indian National Congress politicians
Manipur MLAs 2007–2012
Manipur MLAs 2012–2017